The World junior records in track cycling are ratified by the Union Cycliste Internationale (UCI).

Men
Key to tables:

Women

Notes 
 After the 2013 World Championships (elite), the 3000m / 3 rider format was replaced by a 4000m / 4 rider format.
 Recognised on 250m tracks only.

References
General
World Junior Records – Men 17 February 2020 updated
World Junior Records – Women 25 October 2018 updated
Specific

Track cycling records